The 1894 Stanford football team represented Stanford University in the 1894 college football season and was coached by Walter Camp, who had previously coached the team in 1892.

Herbert Hoover, later the 31st president of the United States, was team manager.

Season summary
Pop Bliss had coached Stanford the previous season at Stanford; Walter Camp, who had coached Stanford in 1892, returned to Stanford for this season and Bliss moved on to coach Haverford College.

After two consecutive tie games, Stanford defeated California 6–0 in the fourth Big Game. Future Stanford head coach Charles Fickert blocked a punt, which was run into the end zone by Guy Cochran for the game's only score. The game with Chicago was the first intersectional contest.

Schedule

Notes

References

Stanford
Stanford Cardinal football seasons
Stanford football